Normal human body-temperature (normothermia, euthermia) is the typical temperature range found in humans.

Human body temperature varies. It depends on sex, age, time of day, exertion level, health status (such as illness and menstruation), what part of the body the measurement is taken at, state of consciousness (waking, sleeping, sedated), and emotions. Body temperature is kept in the normal range by a homeostatic function known as thermoregulation, in which adjustment of temperature is triggered by the central nervous system.

Methods of measurement 

Taking a person's temperature is an initial part of a full clinical examination. There are various types of medical thermometers, as well as sites used for measurement, including:
 In the rectum (rectal temperature)
 In the mouth (oral temperature)
 Under the arm (axillary temperature)
 In the ear (tympanic temperature)
 On the skin of the forehead over the temporal artery
 Using heat flux sensors

Variations 

Temperature control (thermoregulation) is a homeostatic mechanism that keeps the organism at optimum operating temperature, as the temperature affects the rate of chemical reactions. In humans, the average internal temperature is widely accepted to be 37 °C (98.6 °F), a "normal" temperature established in the 1800s. No person always has exactly the same temperature at every moment of the day. Temperatures cycle regularly up and down through the day, as controlled by the person's circadian rhythm. The lowest temperature occurs about two hours before the person normally wakes up. Additionally, temperatures change according to activities and external factors.

Normal human body temperature varies slightly from person to person and by the time of day. Consequently, each type of measurement has a range of normal temperatures.

Reported values vary depending on how it is measured: oral (under the tongue): , internal (rectal, vaginal): . A rectal or vaginal measurement taken directly inside the body cavity is typically slightly higher than oral measurement, and oral measurement is somewhat higher than skin measurement. Other places, such as under the arm or in the ear, produce different typical temperatures. While some people think of these averages as representing normal or ideal measurements, a wide range of temperatures has been found in healthy people. Other circumstances also affect the body's temperature. The core body temperature of an individual tends to have the lowest value in the second half of the sleep cycle; the lowest point, called the nadir, is one of the primary markers for circadian rhythms. The body temperature also changes when a person is hungry, sleepy, sick, or cold.

Natural rhythms 
Body temperature normally fluctuates over the day following circadian rhythms, with the lowest levels around 4a.m. and the highest in the late afternoon, between 4:00 and 6:00 p.m. (assuming the person sleeps at night and stays awake during the day). Therefore, an oral temperature of  would, strictly speaking, be a normal, healthy temperature in the afternoon but not in the early morning.

Body temperature is sensitive to many hormones, so women have a temperature rhythm that varies with the menstrual cycle, called a circamensal rhythm. A woman's basal body temperature rises sharply after ovulation, as estrogen production decreases and progesterone increases. Fertility awareness programs use this change to identify when a woman has ovulated to achieve or avoid pregnancy. During the luteal phase of the menstrual cycle, both the lowest and the average temperatures are slightly higher than during other parts of the cycle. However, the amount that the temperature rises during each day is slightly lower than typical, so the highest temperature of the day is not very much higher than usual.

Temperature also may vary with the change of seasons during each year.  This pattern is called a circannual rhythm.  Studies of seasonal variations have produced inconsistent results.  People living in different climates may have different seasonal patterns.

Increased physical fitness increases the amount of daily variation in temperature.

With increased age, both average body temperature and the amount of daily variability in the body temperature tend to decrease. Elderly patients may have a decreased ability to generate body heat during a fever, so even a somewhat elevated temperature can indicate a serious underlying cause in geriatrics. One study suggested that the average body temperature has also decreased since the 1850s. The study's authors believe the most likely explanation for the change is a reduction in inflammation at the population level due to decreased chronic infections and improved hygiene.

Measurement methods 

Different methods used for measuring temperature produce different results.  The temperature reading depends on which part of the body is being measured.  The typical daytime temperatures among healthy adults are as follows:
 Temperature in the anus (rectum/rectal), vagina, or in the ear (tympanic) is about 
 Temperature in the mouth (oral) is about 
 Temperature under the arm (axillary) is about 

Generally, oral, rectal, gut, and core body temperatures, although slightly different, are well-correlated.

Oral temperatures are influenced by drinking, chewing, smoking, and breathing with the mouth open. Mouth breathing, cold drinks or food, reduce oral temperatures; hot drinks, hot food, chewing, and smoking raise oral temperatures.

Each measurement method also has different normal ranges depending on sex.

Infrared thermometer

As of 2016 reviews of infrared thermometers have found them to be of variable accuracy. This includes tympanic infrared thermometers in children.

Variations due to outside factors 

Sleep disturbances also affect temperatures.  Normally, body temperature drops significantly at a person's normal bedtime and throughout the night.  Short-term sleep deprivation produces a higher temperature at night than normal, but long-term sleep deprivation appears to reduce temperatures.  Insomnia and poor sleep quality are associated with smaller and later drops in body temperature.  Similarly, waking up unusually early, sleeping in, jet lag and changes to shift work schedules may affect body temperature.

Concept

Fever 

A temperature setpoint is the level at which the body attempts to maintain its temperature.  When the setpoint is raised, the result is a fever.  Most fevers are caused by infectious disease and can be lowered, if desired, with antipyretic medications.

Lower thresholds are sometimes appropriate for elderly people. The normal daily temperature variation is typically , but can be greater among people recovering from a fever.

An organism at optimum temperature is considered afebrile, meaning "without fever". If temperature is raised, but the setpoint is not raised, then the result is hyperthermia.

Hyperthermia 

Hyperthermia occurs when the body produces or absorbs more heat than it can dissipate. It is usually caused by prolonged exposure to high temperatures. The heat-regulating mechanisms of the body eventually become overwhelmed and unable to deal effectively with the heat, causing the body temperature to climb uncontrollably. Common symptoms include headache, confusion, and fatigue. If sweating has resulted in dehydration, then the affected person may have dry, red skin.

In a medical setting, mild hyperthermia is commonly called heat exhaustion or heat prostration; severe hyperthermia is called heat stroke.  Heatstroke may come on suddenly, but it usually follows the untreated milder stages.  Treatment involves cooling and rehydrating the body; fever-reducing drugs are useless for this condition.  This may be done by moving out of direct sunlight to a cooler and shaded environment, drinking water, removing clothing that might keep heat close to the body, or sitting in front of a fan. Bathing in tepid or cool water, or even just washing the face and other exposed areas of the skin, can be helpful.

With fever, the body's core temperature rises to a higher temperature through the action of the part of the brain that controls the body temperature; with hyperthermia, the body temperature is raised without the influence of the heat control centers.

Hypothermia 

In hypothermia, body temperature drops below that required for normal metabolism and bodily functions. In humans, this is usually due to excessive exposure to cold air or water, but it can be deliberately induced as a medical treatment.

Basal body temperature 

Basal body temperature is the lowest temperature attained by the body during rest (usually during sleep). It is generally measured immediately after awakening and before any physical activity has been undertaken, although the temperature measured at that time is somewhat higher than the true basal body temperature.  In women, temperature differs at various points in the menstrual cycle, and this can be used in the long term to track ovulation both to aid conception or avoid pregnancy.  This process is called fertility awareness.

Core temperature 
Core temperature, also called core body temperature, is the operating temperature of an organism, specifically in deep structures of the body such as the liver, in comparison to temperatures of peripheral tissues.  Core temperature is normally maintained within a narrow range so that essential enzymatic reactions can occur. Significant core temperature elevation (hyperthermia) or depression (hypothermia) over more than a brief period of time is incompatible with human life.

Temperature examination in the heart, using a catheter, is the traditional gold standard measurement used to estimate core temperature (oral temperature is affected by hot or cold drinks, ambient temperature fluctuations as well as mouth-breathing). Since catheters are highly invasive, the generally accepted alternative for measuring core body temperature is through rectal measurements. Rectal temperature is expected to be approximately 1 Fahrenheit (or 0.55 Celsius) degree higher than an oral temperature taken on the same person at the same time. Ear thermometers measure temperature from the tympanic membrane using infrared sensors and also aim to measure core body temperature, since the blood supply of this membrane is directly shared with the brain. However, this method of measuring body temperature is not as accurate as rectal measurement and has a low sensitivity for fever, failing to determine three or four out of every ten fever measurements in children. Ear temperature measurement may be acceptable for observing trends in body temperature but is less useful in consistently identifying and diagnosing fever.

Until recently, direct measurement of core body temperature required either an ingestible device or surgical insertion of a probe. Therefore, a variety of indirect methods have commonly been used as the preferred alternative to these more accurate albeit more invasive methods.  The rectal or vaginal temperature is generally considered to give the most accurate assessment of core body temperature, particularly in hypothermia. In the early 2000s, ingestible thermistors in capsule form were produced, allowing the temperature inside the digestive tract to be transmitted to an external receiver; one study found that these were comparable in accuracy to rectal temperature measurement. More recently, a new method using heat flux sensors have been developed. Several research papers show that its accuracy is similar to the invasive methods.

Temperature variation

Hot 
  – Normally death, or there may be serious brain damage, continuous convulsions, and shock. Cardio-respiratory collapse will likely occur.
  – Subject may turn pale or remain flushed and red. They may become comatose, be in severe delirium, vomiting, and convulsions can occur.
  – (Medical emergency) – Fainting, vomiting, severe headache, dizziness, confusion, hallucinations, delirium, and drowsiness can occur. There may also be palpitations and breathlessness.
  – Fainting, dehydration, weakness, vomiting, headache, breathlessness, and dizziness may occur as well as profuse sweating.
  – Severe sweating, flushed, and red. Fast heart rate and breathlessness. There may be exhaustion accompanying this. Children and people with epilepsy may suffer convulsions at this temperature.
  – (Classed as hyperthermia if not caused by a fever) – Feeling hot, sweating, feeling thirsty, feeling very uncomfortable, slightly hungry. If this is caused by fever, there may also be chills.

Normal 
  is a typically reported range for normal body temperature.

Cold 
  – Feeling cold, mild to moderate shivering. Body temperature may drop this low during sleep. This can be a normal body temperature for sleeping.
  – (Hypothermia is less than ) – Intense shivering, numbness and bluish/grayness of the skin. There is the possibility of heart irritability.
  – Severe shivering, loss of movement of fingers, blueness, and confusion. Some behavioral changes may take place.
  – Moderate to severe confusion, sleepiness, depressed reflexes, progressive loss of shivering, slow heartbeat, shallow breathing. Shivering may stop. The subject may be unresponsive to certain stimuli.
  – (Medical emergency) – Hallucinations, delirium, complete confusion, extreme sleepiness that is progressively becoming comatose. Shivering is absent (subject may even think they are hot). Reflex may be absent or very slight.
  – Comatose, very rarely conscious. No or slight reflexes.  Very shallow breathing and slow heart rate. Possibility of serious heart rhythm problems.
  – Severe heart rhythm disturbances are likely and breathing may stop at any time. The person may appear to be dead.

There are non-verbal corporal cues that can hint at an individual experiencing a low body temperature, which can be used for those with dysphasia or infants. Examples of non-verbal cues of coldness include stillness and being lethargic concerning kinesiological movement, sneezing, unusual paleness of skin among light-skinned people, and, among males, shrinkage, and contraction of the scrotum.

Historical understanding 
Subsequently, that mean was widely quoted as "37 °C or 98.4 °F" until editors realized 37 °C is equal to 98.6 °F, not 98.4 °F. The 37 °C value was set by German physician Carl Reinhold August Wunderlich in his 1868 book, which put temperature charts into widespread clinical use. Dictionaries and other sources that quoted these averages did add the word "about" to show that there is some variance, but generally did not state how wide the variance is.

References 

Human physiology
Medical terminology
Temperature
Physical examination
Medical signs
Thermoregulation
Thermometers